Juan Manuel Cerúndolo was the defending champion but chose not to defend his title.

Fábián Marozsán won the title after defeating Damir Džumhur 6–2, 6–1 in the final.

Seeds

Draw

Finals

Top half

Bottom half

References

External links
Main draw
Qualifying draw

Banja Luka Challenger - 1
2022 Singles